is a non-alcoholic (0.00% ABV) beer sold in Japan by Asahi Breweries.

Ingredients
Starch
Malt
Glucose-fructose syrup (High-fructose corn syrup)
Humulus lupulus
Flavor
Acidity regulator
Amino acid (Glycine)

External links
 Official website 

Soft drinks
Asahi Breweries